The U80601 was a 16-bit microprocessor made in 1989-1990 by Kombinat Mikroelektronik Erfurt in the former German Democratic Republic  of  East Germany. It was manufactured in NMOS technology and encased in a PLCC or ceramic (CLCC) package (first samples).

This Central Processing Unit (CPU) was a near-identical copy of the Intel 80286 microprocessor. Because it was manufactured in East Germany it was not within Intel's legal power to stop it from being made or sold.

The U80600 system included the following chips:

 U80601: CPU (equiv. to Intel 80286)
 U80606: Bus controller (equiv. to Intel 82288)
 U80608: Error detection and correction (equiv. to Intel R8206)
 U80610: Memory controller for 16 kbit to 256 kbit DRAMs (equiv. to Intel R8207)

Planned, but never released:

 U80612: Clock generator (equiv. to DS80612, SAB82284)
 U80613: FPU (equiv. to Intel 80287 floating point math coprocessor)
 U80614, U80617, U80619: Rolanet 2 network controller (similar to Ethernet, IEEE 802.3)
 U80620: Integrated peripheral controller (CHIPS or SAB82C206)
 U80621: VGA graphics controller (equiv. to Tseng Labs ET3000)
 U80622: RAMDAC (equiv. to Inmos IMSG171P50)

Kombinat Mikroelektronik microprocessors
16-bit microprocessors